Francis Pringle Taylor (1852 – 16 February 1913) was Naval officer, naval commandant of the Queensland colonial navy.
Taylor was born in Edinburgh, the son of Rev. Robert Taylor, of Blairgowrie, Scotland, and joined the navy as a cadet in 1866. After serving in several ships he was invalided and came to Australia in 1879, where from 1880 to 1884 he was lieutenant in command of the colonial corvette HMS Wolverine. In 1884 he raised a volunteer naval artillery corps at Sydney. In 1885 he was promoted to commander of the Wolverine.

From 1888 to 1892 Taylor served in the Queensland gunboat HMQS Gayundah as first lieutenant. 
In October 1888 the commander of the Gayundah  Captain Henry Townley Wright, after a dispute with authorities, was ordered to turn the gunboat over to Taylor. Wright had Taylor arrested but later released him; Wright was dismissed from the Maritime Defence Force.

Taylor was later promoted to senior naval officer and superintendent of the Queensland Naval Defence Force in November 1888. In 1899 he returned to England and settled at Saltash, and in 1901 was given charge of the Naval Employment Agency at Devonport, Devon. His wife was a daughter of the late Rev. W. J. M. Hillyar and granddaughter of Admiral William Hillyar.

External links
Watercolours of ships by Taylor 
Mention in London Gazette, 28 January 1879

References

19th-century Royal Navy personnel
Scottish expatriates in Australia
1847 births
1913 deaths
Military personnel from Edinburgh